Penicillium variabile is an anamorph species of fungus in the genus Penicillium which has been isolated from permafrost deposits. Penicillium variabile produces rugulovasine A and rugulovasine B This species occurs on wheat, flour, maize, rice, and barley, and it is also very common in indoor environments.

In the University of Newcasttle, and publicated in the Journal of Parkinson’s Disease, was found that the Penicillium variable P16 is a main marker of the advancement of the Parkinson illness (with the loss of  telomere length and P21)

References

Further reading 

 
 
 
 
 
 

variabile
Fungi described in 1912